= Mostafa Fatemi =

American electrical engineer

Mostafa Fatemi is an electrical engineer at the Mayo Clinic in Rochester, Minnesota. He was named a Fellow of the Institute of Electrical and Electronics Engineers (IEEE) in 2012 for his contribution to ultrasound radiation force imaging and tissue characterization.
